Wild card Jozef Kovalik clinched his maiden ATP Challenger Tour title, beating Andrey Kuznetsov 6–1, 6–4

Seeds

Draw

Finals

Top half

Bottom half

References
 Main Draw
 Qualifying Draw

Maserati Challenger - Singles
2014 Singles